The enzyme pyridoxal phosphatase (EC 3.1.3.74) catalyzes the reaction

pyridoxal 5′-phosphate + H2O  pyridoxal + phosphate

This enzyme belongs to the family of hydrolases, specifically those acting on phosphoric monoester bonds.  The systematic name is pyridoxal-5′-phosphate phosphohydrolase. Other names in common use include vitamine B6 (pyridoxine) phosphatase, PLP phosphatase, vitamin B6-phosphate phosphatase, and PNP phosphatase.  This enzyme participates in vitamin B6 metabolism.

Structural studies

References

 

EC 3.1.3
Enzymes of known structure